Klisura Monastery or Klisurski manastir (Клисурски манастир) may refer to the following monasteries:

Klisurski Monastery in Bulgaria, Orthodox monastery founded in 1869
Klisura Monastery (Serbia), Orthodox monastery founded in early 13th century